The Sunsás orogeny was an ancient orogeny active during the Late Paleoproterozoic and Mesoproterozoic and currently preserved as the Sunsás orogen in the Amazonian Craton in South America. About 85% of the belt is covered by Phanerozoic sediments. Among the remaining 15% of the orogen exposed at surface the best outcrops lies around the Bolivia-Brazil border. It is thought that the original orogen once spanned an area from Venezuela to Argentina and Paraguay. The western and southeastern fringes of the Sunsás orogen have been incorporated into the Andean orogeny and the Brasiliano orogeny respectively. The Sunsás orogeny was active during four separate phases:
Santa Helena orogeny 1465–1427 Ma
Candeias orogeny 1371–1319 Ma
San Andrés orogeny ca. 1275 Ma
Nova Brasilândia orogeny 1180–1110 Ma

References

Orogenies of South America
Geology of Colombia
Geology of Ecuador
Geology of Bolivia
Geology of Brazil
Geology of Peru
Mesoproterozoic orogenies
Precambrian South America